Min Sithu is one of the 37 nats in the Burmese pantheon of nats. He is the nat representation of King Alaungsithu of Pagan, who was assassinated by his son Narathu in 1167. He is portrayed sitting on a throne with one knee up and his foot on the seat, wearing royal garments.

References

31